Undine is a category of elemental beings associated with water.

Undine or Undina may also refer to:

Art
 Undine, by John William Waterhouse (1872)
 Undine, a graffito by Harald Naegeli (1978)

Literature 
 Undine (novella) (1811), a novella by Friedrich de la Motte Fouqué
 Undine 2004, a novel by Penni Russon
 Undine, an autobiographical book by Olive Schreiner (1928)
 "Undine geht", a short story by Ingeborg Bachmann (1961)
 "Undine", a poem by Seamus Heaney (1969)
 Undine Spragg, the protagonist of Edith Wharton's novel The Custom of the Country (1913)

Music and ballet

Classical
 Undina, an opera by Alexei Lvov (1846)
 Undina (Tchaikovsky), an opera (1869) by Pyotr Tchaikovsky to the Russian libretto by Vladimir Sollogub
 Undine (Hoffmann), an opera by E.T.A. Hoffmann (1814)
 Undine (Lortzing), an opera by Albert Lortzing (1845)
 Undina, a juvenile opera by Prokofiev
 Sonata Undine, a Romantic sonata for flute and piano (in E-minor) by Carl Reinecke
 Undine, a prelude for piano by Claude Debussy (1911–13)

Popular music
 "Undine", a song on Laura Marling's fourth album, Once I Was an Eagle
 Undine, the opening theme song for the manga Aria, from the Yui Makino album Tenkyū no Ongaku

Film
 Undine (1916 film), a 1916 American silent fantasy drama film based upon the novel by de la Motte Fouqué
 Undine (2020 film), a 2020 German film

Science
 Undina (fish), a genus of prehistoric lobe-finned fish
 92 Undina, an asteroid
 Undine (medical), an ophthalmic irrigation device (now little used).

Ships
 , eight ships in the Royal Navy
 , a ship in the German High Seas Fleet
 , two ships in the United States Navy
 Undine (Colorado River sternwheeler), a steamboat on the Colorado River
 Undine (Columbia River sternwheeler), a steamboat on the Columbia River

Video games, comics and animation
 Undine, one of the four races in Oblivion in Primal
 Undine, the formal name of Species 8472 in the video game Star Trek Online
 Undine, a race in the video game Yggdra Union
 Undine, is passenger boat in the manga, anime and PS2 game Aria
 Undine, a character from the Claymore anime & manga series
 Undyne, a character in Undertale

Places and clubs
 Undine, Georgia, a community in the United States
 Undine, Michigan, ghost town
 Villa Undine, a resort architecture mansion in Binz, Rugia Island, Germany
 Undine Barge Club, an amateur rowing club in Philadelphia, Pennsylvania

See also
 Ondine (disambiguation)